The Rural Municipality of St. François Xavier is a rural municipality in Manitoba, Canada, lying west-northwest of Winnipeg. It is part of the Central Plains Region as well as the Winnipeg Metro Region. It had a population of 1,411 in the 2016 census.

It is home to the community of St. François Xavier, the second oldest settlement in Manitoba.

History
The area around current-day St. François, commonly known as White Horse Plain (named after a local legend), was inhabited by First Nations peoples such as the Cree and Sioux. Around 1824, Métis leader Cuthbert Grant received a land grant on White Horse Plain and founded a settlement. He was soon joined by a number of Métis families. The settlement was originally called Grantown.

In 1828, the Parish of St. François Xavier (named for St. François-Xavier) was established at White Horse Plain by priests from the mission at Saint-Boniface as the second parish in the North West. The Grantown settlement subsequently took its name from the parish, and St. François Xavier became a municipality in 1880.

The focal point for the municipality was the community of St. François Xavier, which was established in 1824 by Reverend Father Boucher.

The present St. Francois Xavier Roman Catholic Church was designed by former St. Francois Xavier architect Joseph-Azarie Senecal. 

The Grey Nuns also had an educational and religious presence in the area for 118 years, ending their involvement in 1968 after their nunnery fell in disrepair.

Demographics 

Notable people 

 Cuthbert Grant — a Métis leader
 Pascal Breland — a Métis political leader, landowner, and negotiator
 Patrice Breland — reeve for the RM of St. François Xavier from 1891 to 1892 and from 1895 to 1900
 Pierre Falcon — a Métis songwriter

See also
 St. François Xavier Airport

References

 R.M. of St. Francois Xavier Community Profile
 Community Profile: St. François Xavier Rural Municipality, Manitoba; Statistics Canada

External links
 Official website
 Map of St. François Xavier R.M. at Statcan

St. Francois Xavier
St. Francois Xavier